Chen Gexin (September 19, 1914 — January 25, 1961) was a Chinese popular music songwriter. He also used the pen names Lín Méi and Qìng Yú. Chen Genxin was beaten to death in his sleep during the Rightist movement.

Biography

Chen was born on September 19, 1914 to a low social status family, and his wealthy maternal Indian grandfather was the only survivor of the British colonial destructions in India. He married his admirer and student Jin Jiaoli, against her Korean family's wishes in 1935. During WWII, he was jailed for his patriotic songs. Chen and his family moved to Hong Kong after the war ended.

With the Communist seizure of power in China in 1949, popular music was considered ideologically suspect and Chen was labeled a rightist and imprisoned in a laogai for "reform through labor" at Baimiaoling farm, Anhui in 1957, there he befriended a journalist named Ai Yi.

According to an essay and reports by Ai Yi, Chen Genxin was beaten to death during the Rightist movement. He was buried in the mass grave at the hill near the farm. A year later, Chen's widow Jin Jiaoli went there with a box to search through the dead bodies in a vain effort to collect his remains.

Music
Throughout his life, Chen had produced more than 200 songs. On top of that, he conducted symphony orchestras and held recitals for many times. Chen was the composer of famous mid-20th century popular standards as Shanghai Nights and The Blossom of Youth, both sung by Zhou Xuan.  His song Rose, Rose, I Love You, sung by American singer Frankie Laine in 1951, is the only major popular music hit in the United States by a Chinese composer. When Chen's youngest son went to the United States for advanced education, he was able to meet Laine and thereafter maintained a correspondence. Another of his songs titled, Wishing You Happiness and Prosperity was originally written to celebrate the end of the Second Sino-Japanese War and has become a popular Chinese New Year standard. His music continues to be performed and is featured in films such as Eros.

Descendants
Chen Gexin and his muse Jin Jiaoli are the parents of Chinese classical composer, Chen Gang (陳剛 Chén Gāng) and grandfather of China's first "Miss Internet," Chen Fanhong.

Notes

Chinese songwriters
1914 births
1961 deaths
Musicians from Shanghai
Republic of China musicians
People's Republic of China musicians
20th-century Chinese musicians
Victims of the Anti-Rightist Campaign
Chinese people of Indian descent